The Bezirk Feldkirch is an administrative district (Bezirk) in Vorarlberg, Austria.

Area of the district is 278.26 km², population is 100,656 (2012), and population density 362 persons per km². Administrative center of the district is Feldkirch.

Administrative divisions 
The district is divided into 24 municipalities, one of them is a town, and three of them are market towns.

Towns 
 Feldkirch (31,054)

Market towns 
 Frastanz (6,274)
 Götzis (10,795)
 Rankweil (11,635)

Municipalities 
 Altach (6,397)
 Düns (377)
 Dünserberg (147)
 Fraxern (677)
 Göfis (3,083)
 Klaus (3,102)
 Koblach (4,269)
 Laterns (678)
 Mäder (3,739)
 Meiningen (2,035)
 Röns (314)
 Röthis (1,922)
 Satteins (2,590)
 Schlins (2,271)
 Schnifis (762)
 Sulz (2,390)
 Übersaxen (629)
 Viktorsberg (389)
 Weiler (2,022)
 Zwischenwasser (3,105)

(population numbers as of January 1, 2012)

Notes and references

 
Districts of Vorarlberg